Irina Zuykova (30 May 1958 – 25 December 2010) was a Soviet equestrian. She competed in two events at the 1992 Summer Olympics.

References

External links

1958 births
2010 deaths
Soviet female equestrians
Olympic equestrians of the Unified Team
Equestrians at the 1992 Summer Olympics
Place of birth missing